Baker v. Carr, 369 U.S. 186 (1962), was a landmark United States Supreme Court case in which the Court held that redistricting qualifies as a justiciable question under the equal protection clause of the Fourteenth Amendment, thus enabling federal courts to hear Fourteenth Amendment-based redistricting cases.  The court summarized its Baker holding in a later decision as follows: "Equal Protection Clause of the Fourteenth Amendment limits the authority of a State Legislature in designing the geographical districts from which representatives are chosen either for the State Legislature or for the Federal House of Representatives." (Gray v. Sanders). The court had previously held in Gomillion v. Lightfoot that districting claims over racial discrimination could be brought under the Fifteenth Amendment.

The case arose from a lawsuit against the state of Tennessee, which had not conducted redistricting since 1901. The state of Tennessee argued that the composition of legislative districts constituted a nonjusticiable political question, as the U.S. Supreme Court had held in Colegrove v. Green (1946). In a majority opinion joined by five other justices, Associate Justice William J. Brennan Jr. held that redistricting did not qualify as a political question, though he remanded the case to the federal district court for further proceedings. Associate Justice Felix Frankfurter strongly dissented, arguing that the Court's decision cast aside history and judicial restraint and violated the separation of powers between legislatures and courts.

The case did not have any immediate effect on electoral districts, but it set an important precedent regarding the power of federal courts to address redistricting. In 1964, the Supreme Court would hand down two cases, Wesberry v. Sanders and Reynolds v. Sims, which required the United States House of Representatives and state legislatures to establish electoral districts of equal population on the principle of one person, one vote.

Background
Plaintiff Charles Baker was a Republican who lived in Shelby County, Tennessee, and had served as the mayor of Millington, Tennessee, near Memphis. The Tennessee State Constitution required that legislative districts for the Tennessee General Assembly be redrawn every ten years to provide for districts of substantially equal population (as was to be done for congressional districts). Baker's complaint was that Tennessee had not redistricted since 1901, in response to the 1900 census.

By the time of Baker's lawsuit, the population had shifted such that his district in Shelby County had about ten times as many residents as some of the rural districts. The votes of rural citizens were overrepresented compared to those of urban citizens. Baker's argument was that this discrepancy was causing him to fail to receive the "equal protection of the laws" required by the Fourteenth Amendment. Defendant Joe Carr was sued in his position as Secretary of State for Tennessee. Carr was not the person who set the district lines – the state legislature had done that – but was sued ex officio as the person who was ultimately responsible for the conduct of elections in the state and for the publication of district maps.

The state of Tennessee argued that the composition of legislative districts was essentially a political question, not a judicial one, as had been held by Colegrove v. Green, a plurality opinion of the Court in which Justice Felix Frankfurter declared that "Courts ought not to enter this political thicket." Frankfurter believed that relief for legislative malapportionment had to be won through the political process.

Decision
The decision of Baker v. Carr was one of the most wrenching in the Court's history. The case had to be put over for reargument because in conference no clear majority emerged for either side of the case. Associate Justice Charles Evans Whittaker was so torn over the case that he eventually had to recuse himself for health reasons. The arduous decisional process in Baker is often blamed for Whittaker's subsequent health problems, which forced him to retire from the Court in 1962.

The opinion was finally handed down in March 1962, nearly a year after it was initially argued. The Court split 6 to 2 in ruling that Baker's case was justiciable, producing, in addition to the opinion of the Court by Justice William J. Brennan, three concurring opinions and two dissenting opinions. Brennan reformulated the political question doctrine, identifying six factors to help in determining which questions were "political" in nature. Cases that are political in nature are marked by:
 "Textually demonstrable constitutional commitment of the issue to a coordinate political department;" as an example of this, Brennan cited issues of foreign affairs and executive war powers, arguing that cases involving such matters would be "political questions"
 "A lack of judicially discoverable and manageable standards for resolving it;"
 "The impossibility of deciding without an initial policy determination of a kind clearly for nonjudicial discretion;"
 "The impossibility of a court's undertaking independent resolution without expressing lack of the respect due coordinate branches of government;"
 "An unusual need for unquestioning adherence to a political decision already made;"
 "The potentiality of embarrassment from multifarious pronouncements by various departments on one question."

Justice Tom C. Clark switched his vote at the last minute to a concurrence on the substance of Baker's claims, which would have enabled a majority which could have granted relief for Baker. Instead the Supreme Court remanded the case to the District Court.

The large majority in this case can in many ways be attributed to Justice Brennan, who convinced Potter Stewart that the case was a narrow ruling dealing only with the right to challenge the statute. Brennan also talked down Justices Black and Douglas from their usual absolutist positions to achieve a compromise.

Dissent by Justices Frankfurter and Harlan
Frankfurter, joined by Justice John Marshall Harlan II, dissented vigorously and at length, arguing that the Court had cast aside history and judicial restraint, and violated the separation of powers between legislatures and Courts. He wrote:
Appellants invoke the right to vote and to have their votes counted. But they are permitted to vote and their votes are counted. They go to the polls, they cast their ballots, they send their representatives to the state councils. Their complaint is simply that the representatives are not sufficiently numerous or powerful.

Aftermath

Having declared redistricting issues justiciable in Baker, the court laid out a new test for evaluating such claims. The Court formulated the famous "one person, one vote" standard under American jurisprudence for legislative redistricting, holding that each individual had to be weighted equally in legislative apportionment. This affected numerous state legislatures that had not redistricted congressional districts for decades, despite major population shifts. It also ultimately affected the composition of state legislative districts as well, which in Alabama and numerous other states had overrepresented rural districts and underrepresented urban districts with much greater populations.

This principle was formally enunciated in Reynolds v. Sims (1964). The Court decided that in states with bicameral legislatures, as had Alabama, the state in this suit, both houses had to be apportioned on this standard. This voided the provision of the Alabama Constitution which had provided for two state senators from each county and similar provisions elsewhere. Similarly, the Tennessee Constitution had a provision that prevented counties from being split and portions of a county being attached to other counties or parts of counties in the creation of a legislative district. This was overridden under the principle of basing districts on population. Today counties are frequently split among districts in forming Tennessee State Senate districts. "One person, one vote" was first applied as a standard for Congressional districts. State legislatures were supposed to redistrict according to changes in population but many had not for decades.

Baker v. Carr and subsequent cases fundamentally changed the nature of political representation in the United States, requiring not just Tennessee but nearly every state to redistrict during the 1960s, often several times. This re-apportionment increased the political power of urban areas with greater population and reduced the influence of more rural areas. After he left the Court, Chief Justice Earl Warren called the Baker v. Carr line of cases the most important in his tenure as Chief Justice.

See also
 List of United States Supreme Court cases, volume 369
 Gomillion v. Lightfoot, 364 U.S. 339 (1960), was a landmark decision of the Supreme Court of the United States that found an electoral district with boundaries created to disenfranchise African Americans violated the Fifteenth Amendment.
 Colegrove v. Green, : Disparities in Congressional districts are non-judiciable.  "The remedy for unfairness in districting is to secure State legislatures that will apportion properly, or to invoke the ample powers of Congress." (Illinois).
 Baker v. Carr, : Overturning Colegrove; Redistricting qualifies as a justiciable question.  As summarized in Gray, the decision established that Equal Protection "...limits the authority of a State Legislature in designing the geographical districts from which representatives are chosen either for the State Legislature or for the Federal House of Representatives." (Tennessee).
Subsequent Cases Regarding Size/Proportionality:
 Gray v. Sanders, : "One person, one vote." Statewide elections (US Senator, Governor, etc.) must not employ a geographical-unit system that renders some votes greater than others because it "violates the Equal Protection Clause of the Fourteenth Amendment" and that "...once a geographical unit for which a representative is to be chosen is designated, all who participate in the election must have an equal vote..." (Georgia).
Wesberry v. Sanders, : Districts for United States House of Representatives must be approximately equal in population as established by Article 1, Section 2 of the Constitution. (Georgia).
 Reynolds v. Sims, : Districts for State Legislatures (both chambers) must be approximately equal in population as established by Equal Protection. (Alabama).
Gaffney v. Cummings, : "Minor deviations from mathematical equality among state legislative districts," such as a deviation of 7.83%, are not automatically unconstitutional but rather allowable where there are legitimate State interests.  (Connecticut).
Karcher v. Daggett, : The "equal representation" standard of Art. I, § 2, requires a "good faith" effort to ensure congressional districts be apportioned to achieve population equality.  No such good faith was used for a ~1% deviation which is therefore unconstitutional.  (New Jersey).
Evenwel v. Abbott,  District drawn using total population ('one person, one vote') are valid even when the result is wide deviation among voting population (~40%).  Ruling withheld as to whether states may alternatively draw district maps using eligible voters (rather than total population). (Texas).
Subsequent Cases Regarding Racial Composition:
City of Mobile v. Bolden,  A municipal electoral system is constitutional if it does not have a discriminatory purpose, even if it has a discriminatory effect. (Alabama)
Thornburg v. Gingles, : Three preconditions required to find a redistricting plan violates VRA §2[a]: (1) the minority group is "sufficiently large and geographically compact to constitute a majority in a single-member district," (2) is "politically cohesive" and (3) the "majority votes sufficiently as a bloc to enable it [to] usually to defeat the minority's preferred candidate."  (North Carolina).
Shaw v. Reno, : Attempt to create an additional majority-minority Congressional district challenged and held invalid because Redistricting based on race must be held to a standard of strict scrutiny under the equal protection clause. (North Carolina).
Miller v. Johnson, 515 U.S. 900 (1995): Attempt to create an additional majority-minority Congressional district challenged held invalid because it required the creation of a "geographic monstrosity" thereby violating Equal Protection of the majority, Justice Department "maximization" policy not enough of a compelling governmental interest (Georgia).
 Georgia v. Ashcroft, 539 U.S. 461 (2003): The District Court failed to consider all the relevant factors in evaluating 1997 State Senate districting plan - remanded for additional scrutiny (Georgia).
Bartlett v. Strickland, : "Cross-over" voters (members of a majority who tend to vote for the preferred candidate of the minority) should not be attributed to the minority group when calculating whether the minority constitutes a numerical majority of the voting-age population (relative to Gingles 1st criteria). (North Carolina).
Alabama Legislative Black Caucus v. Alabama, : Racial gerrymandering claims must be considered district-by-district, rather than by looking at the state as an undifferentiated whole. (Alabama).

References

Further reading

External links
 
 Baker v. Carr Case Brief, Lawnix.com
 "Supreme Court Landmark Case Baker v. Carr" from C-SPAN's Landmark Cases: Historic Supreme Court Decisions
 The Political Thicket a podcast episode on the case from Radiolab More Perfect, WNYC Studios

United States Constitution Article Three case law
United States Supreme Court cases of the Warren Court
United States electoral redistricting case law
United States One Person, One Vote Legal Doctrine
United States political question doctrine case law
Civil rights movement case law
African-American history of Tennessee
Legal history of Tennessee
Tennessee General Assembly
1962 in United States case law
United States Supreme Court cases